Priyantha Rathnayake (born 28 July 1989) is a Sri Lankan cricketer. He made his Twenty20 debut on 14 March 2021, for Sri Lanka Army Sports Club in the 2020–21 SLC Twenty20 Tournament. He made his List A debut on 28 March 2021, for Sri Lanka Army Sports Club in the 2020–21 Major Clubs Limited Over Tournament.

References

External links
 

1989 births
Living people
Sri Lankan cricketers
Sri Lanka Army Sports Club cricketers
Place of birth missing (living people)